Abdy Azimovich Bashimov (born 12 December 1995) is a Turkmen footballer currently playing for FC Ahal in Ýokary Liga. He was part of the Turkmenistan national team from 2019.

Club career 
In recent years he has been playing for the FC Ahal.

In February 2020, he signed a contract with the Uzbek club FC Qizilqum Zarafshon.  On 1 March 2020, Bashimov made his debut in the Uzbekistan Super League in a 1–3 loss against Nasaf. In August 2020 he left the club.

On 30 March 2021, it was announced that Bäşimow signed a deal with FC Ahal, moving on a free transfer.

International career 
He played for Turkmenistan futsal team at 2017 Asian Indoor and Martial Arts Games.

Bashimov made his senior national team debut on 10 October 2019, in an 2022 FIFA World Cup qualification match against Lebanon.

International goals
Scores and results Turkmenistan's goal tally first.

References

1995 births
Living people
Turkmenistan footballers
Turkmenistan international footballers
Futsal players
Sportspeople from Ashgabat
Association football defenders
Expatriate footballers in Uzbekistan
Uzbekistan Super League players
Turkmenistan expatriate footballers
FC Qizilqum Zarafshon players